Wes Chandler Horton (born January 18, 1990) is a former American football defensive end. He played college football at USC. He is the brother of former Toronto Argonauts linebacker Shane Horton. He was signed by the Carolina Panthers as an undrafted free agent in 2013 and spent the bulk of his seven NFL seasons with the team.

Early years

Horton was born and raised in Los Angeles, California. He attended Notre Dame High School. As a junior, he was selected to the Cal-Hi Sports All-State Underclass second-team and also was named to Los Angeles Daily News All-Area first-team and All-Serra League first-team.  As a senior, he was selected to the Prep Star All-American, Super Prep All-Farwest, Prep Star All-West teams. He also was selected to the All-CIF Pac-5 Division first-team and Los Angeles Daily News All-Area second-team.

Professional career

Carolina Panthers
On April 28, 2013, he signed with the Carolina Panthers as an undrafted free agent. In his rookie season, Horton played in 10 games and recorded eight tackles and two sacks.

On November 23, 2015, Horton was suspended for four games by the National Football League for violating the NFL Performance Enhancement Drug Policy after testing positive for a performance-enhancing substance. On December 28, 2015, the Carolina Panthers waived Horton.

On February 7, 2016, Horton's Panthers played in Super Bowl 50. In the game, the Panthers fell to the Denver Broncos by a score of 24–10.

Horton re-signed with the Panthers on a one-year deal on February 16, 2016. On September 4, 2016, Horton was released by the Panthers. He was re-signed by the team on October 14, 2016.

On February 27, 2017, Horton signed a two-year contract extension with the Panthers through the 2018 season.

On September 10, 2017, Horton sacked quarterback Brian Hoyer and forced a fumble, which the Panthers recovered, in the season opening 23–3 victory over the San Francisco 49ers.

New Orleans Saints
On May 21, 2019, Horton signed with the New Orleans Saints. He was released on September 9, 2019.

Carolina Panthers (second stint)
On November 6, 2019, Horton signed with the Carolina Panthers.

Horton retired on February 4, 2020, citing a desire to preserve his health and mentor younger athletes at the high school level.

Personal life
Wes Horton's father is Michael (Myke) Horton, former UCLA offensive lineman who played nine years as a backup on various NFL, CFL, and USFL teams before becoming nationally known as "Gemini", one of the original American Gladiators (1989–1992).

References

External links
USC Trojans bio
Carolina Panthers bio

1990 births
Living people
American football defensive ends
Carolina Panthers players
New Orleans Saints players
People from Chatsworth, Los Angeles
Players of American football from Los Angeles
USC Trojans football players